Nina Raginsky , (born April 14, 1941) is a Canadian photographer who received the honour of the Order of Canada in 1984.

Life and work
Born in Montreal, Quebec, she received a Bachelor of Arts degree from Rutgers University in 1962. While at Rutgers she studied painting with Roy Lichtenstein, sculpture with George Segal and Art History with Allan Kaprow.

From 1963 to 1981, she was a freelance photographer with the National Film Board of Canada. Her photographs have appeared in various books by the National Film Board of Canada.

She was made an Officer of the Order of Canada in 1984. She is a member of the Royal Canadian Academy of Arts. Her photographs have appeared in Queen (magazine), Daily London Telegraph Magazine, and L'Express Paris. From 1962, her photographs have been in numerous exhibits at the George Eastman Museum Rochester, New York, the San Francisco Museum, the Burton Gallery in Toronto, the National Gallery of Canada, and the Photo Gallery in Ottawa, among others.

Nina Raginsky, photographer (b at Montréal 14 Apr 1941). Educated at Rutgers University in New Jersey, Raginsky turned to photography seriously in 1964, doing freelance work for the National Film Board. She worked first in black and white but later began to sepia tone and hand-colour her prints. She has also created oil paintings based on photographs. After spending a year in Mexico, she returned to Canada in 1968 and began a project recording remote life in the Yukon and First Nations communities in British Columbia. The following year, she became an assistance curator of education at the Vancouver Art Gallery until 1972. She then began a series of photos documenting the city and people of Vancouver, Victoria, and British Columbia. Between 1972 and 1981, Raginsky was an instructor at the Emily Carr College of Art, formerly Vancouver School of Art. Her work has appeared in solo and group exhibitions in Canada and the US and in various magazines and books, including those of the National Film Board's "Image" series, Canada: A Year of the Land and Between Friends. She is best known for her frontal, full-figure portraits, particularly of eccentric or whimsical personalities.<ref>'Faking Death: Canadian Art Photography and the Canadian Imagination. (2003) Cousineau-Levine, Penny.</ref> One such example is the 1974 work, The Kirkpatrick Sisters in front of the Empress Hotel, Victoria, British Columbia. Raginsky left the photographic medium during the 1980s and turned almost exclusively to painting. In 1985 she was made an Officer of the Order of Canada.

In 2015, her photo Shoeshine Stand appeared on Canada Post postage stamps.

Artistic inspiration
Nina Raginsky has cited German photographer, August Sander as inspiration for her portraits in particular his work, Men Without Masks''.

Notes

References 
 

1941 births
Living people
Canadian women artists
Canadian women photographers
Officers of the Order of Canada
Artists from Montreal
Members of the Royal Canadian Academy of Arts